Geoff Garin (born 1953) is an American pollster, who served as co-chief strategist for the latter part of Senator Hillary Clinton's 2008 Presidential campaign. He was a pollster and strategist in 2011-2012 for Priorities USA Action, the superPAC that supported Barack Obama's reelection, and currently serves in those same roles for Priorities USA in support of Hillary Clinton's election as president.

Hart Research

Garin is the president of Hart Research Associates, a survey research firm.  He became president of Hart Research in 1984, after having worked in the firm since 1978 as a senior analyst and vice president. He has conducted polling projects for a wide variety of foundations and non-profit organizations.  The foundations for which he has undertaken policy research on include the Pew Charitable Trusts, the Bill and Melinda Gates Foundation, the Packard Foundation, the Gill Foundation, and the Annie E. Casey Foundation.

Garin's body of research has also included projects for the University of California, the College Board, the Alliance for Justice, the Association of Trial Lawyers of America, and the Fannie Mae Foundation. He has conducted research on health care issues for the Kaiser Family Foundation and the Blue Cross and Blue Shield Association. His work on international policy issues includes studies for CARE, the U.S. Fund for UNICEF, and the United Nations Foundation. His work was also used in the 2013 book The Kennedy Half-Century.

Garin has also worked for numerous politicians, such as Senators Max Baucus, Robert Byrd, John Rockefeller, and Hillary Clinton, and Virginia Governor Mark Warner.

2008 Presidential election 

Garin was hired in March 2008 as a pollster for Hillary Clinton's Presidential campaign. Along with Howard Wolfson, he replaced Mark Penn as the Clinton Campaign's campaign coordinators in April 2008, after the Wall Street Journal revealed that Penn met with a Colombian official regarding a proposed free trade agreement opposed by Clinton and most labor unions. The New York Times speculated at the time that the change might lead to a less negative tone by the Clinton campaign.

Personal life 
Garin was graduated from Harvard University, class of 1975. He is married to Deborah Berkowitz, an expert in occupational safety and health, and has two sons.

References

External links

1953 births
Living people
Harvard University alumni
Pollsters
American political consultants
Hillary Clinton 2008 presidential campaign